Phebalium bullatum, commonly known as silvery phebalium, desert phebalium or sand phebalium, is a species of shrub that is endemic to southern continental Australia. It is more or less covered with silvery scales and has narrow oblong to narrow wedge-shaped leaves and yellow flowers in umbels of about six.

Description
The branchlets are also covered with warty glands. The upper surface of the leaves is glabrous and channelled, the lower surface convex and covered with silvery scales. Flowering occurs from August to October.

Taxonomy
Phebalium bullatum was first formally described in 1916 by John McConnell Black and the description was published in Transactions and proceedings of the Royal Society of South Australia.

Distribution and habitat
Silvery phebalium is found on sandy soils in mallee scrub between the Eyre Peninsula in South Australia and north-western Victoria.

References

Flora of South Australia
Flora of Victoria (Australia)
bullatum
Plants described in 1916
Taxa named by John McConnell Black